Brian Jefferson (birth unknown), also known by the nickname of "Bootsie", is an English former rugby union, and professional rugby league footballer who played in the 1960s and 1970s.

Background

Playing career

International honours
Brian Jefferson won a cap for England (RL) while at Keighley in 1968 against Wales.

Testimonial match
Brian Jefferson's Testimonial match at Keighley took place in 1977.

Career records
Brian Jefferson holds Keighley's "Most points a career" record with 2,116-points scored over 13-seasons.

References

External links
Into The 60s
Progress In The 70s
 (archived by archive.is) INTO THE SIXTIES

England national rugby league team players
English rugby league players
English rugby union players
Keighley Cougars players
Living people
Place of birth missing (living people)
Rugby league fullbacks
Year of birth missing (living people)
Yorkshire rugby league team players